Rhombophryne vaventy is a large species of frogs of the Madagascar endemic microhylid subfamily Cophylinae. It is one of the largest members of its genus.

Range and distribution
Rhombophryne vaventy is endemic to the Marojejy massif in northern Madagascar, where it was originally described from two individuals, captured at high altitude.

Description
In life, the dorsal skin is highly textured. It lacks webbing between the fingers and toes, and has very long legs. It possesses four unequally sized spines above each eye, characteristic of its species group.

Habitat and ecology
Rhombophryne vaventy is found in montane rainforest at high altitude (~ above sea level) on the Marojejy massif.  Like most Rhombophryne species, R. vaventy is a terrestrial or possibly semi-fossorial frog. It is a generalist predator, and its diet is known to include relatively large arthrosphaerid pill millipedes of the genus Zoosphaerium. Nothing is currently known of its breeding or calling behaviour.

Taxonomy
Rhombophryne vaventy was confused with R. serratopalpebrosa until the taxonomy of the R. serratopalpebrosa species complex began to be resolved. It differs from R. serratopalpebrosa in its size, eye spines, skin texture, and numerous other characters. Ongoing resolution of this complex has yielded several new species, including R. ornata and R. tany.

References 

vaventy
Endemic frogs of Madagascar
Amphibians described in 2014
Taxa named by Mark D. Scherz
Taxa named by Frank Glaw
Taxa named by Miguel Vences